The Outside Lands Music and Arts Festival is a music festival held annually in San Francisco, California, at Golden Gate Park. The festival is produced by Another Planet Entertainment, Superfly Presents, and Starr Hill Presents. It is the largest independently owned music festival in the US. In 2019, it was one of the world's highest grossing festivals with revenues of almost $30 million.

History 

The inaugural festival occurred August 22–24, 2008, with Radiohead as the first band to play after dark. It included more than 60 musical acts, as well as several art installations. The festival grounds included the Polo Fields (home to the Lands End Stage), Hellman's Hollow/Speedway Meadow (Twin Peaks and Panhandle stages), and Lindley Meadow (Sutro and Presidio stages). Bringing in 40,000 to 60,000 attendees a day, the inaugural festival was mostly a success; however, it was criticized for its lack of crowd control and disruption to the normally quiet Richmond and Sunset District neighborhoods.

The second edition of the festival was held August 28–30, 2009, and streamed live on YouTube via the festival's YouTube account. It was not as successful as the inaugural year with a smaller turnout. The Beastie Boys were scheduled to be the headliners, however, they dropped out of the lineup a month before the festival after Adam Yauch was diagnosed with cancer. Promoters scaled the event down to 40 total acts over two days for the third year.

During the 2014 event, San Francisco police seized hundreds of counterfeit wristbands used by scalpers. This resulted in an adoption of radio frequency identification (RF) wristbands for 2015, along with an accusation that Fantastic Negrito was selling illegal VIP passes to the event.

This festival went on hiatus in 2020 due to COVID-19 restrictions. The 2021 edition occurred on Halloween Weekend, October 29–31.

Grass Lands 
The 2019 iteration became the first major music festival to offer legal cannabis for sale, after the San Francisco Office of Cannabis granted a temporary sales permit to Outside Lands. San Francisco-based brands Green Door, Lady Chatterley Delivery, Flower to the People and Posh Green Collective were also available in Grass Lands. There were no requests for medical transport in the designated area, and all participants were required to throw away any alcoholic beverages before entering and show a 21+ identification.

Other attractions 
Outside Lands also features attractions that focus around food, wine, and art. There is a wine lands portion of the festival that allows people to purchase tickets and sample wine from many different vendors. There are also areas that offer separate entertainment, including a sports lounge, an arcade/bar, and various food and art vendors.

Despite its large environmental footprint, the festival has attempted to promote strategies of being eco-friendly. There are solar powered stages, a refillable water program, a waste diversion program, a recycling program, and bike valet parking program. There have also been workshops to educate concert attendees about organic food and farming.

Line-ups

2008

2009

2010

2011

2012

2013

2014

2015

2016

2017

2018

2019

2021

2022

See also

Bonnaroo Music & Arts Festival

References

External links
Board of Supervisors Unanimously Approved Recreation and Park's Outside Lands Contract
Official website

Pop music festivals in the United States
2008 establishments in California
Rock festivals in the United States
Music festivals established in 2008
Music festivals in California
Festivals in the San Francisco Bay Area